Miss World Denmark is a beauty pageant that came into existence in 2004 when the Miss Denmark competition split into two separate competitions: Miss World Denmark and Miss Universe Denmark. The former Miss World 2008 contestant Lisa Lents, became the National Director of the pageant the year after her participation. When Lisa Lents represented Denmark at the Miss World competition, Unibet guessed that she would place fifth, while NordicBet guessed that she would come in first as the first contestant from Denmark in history. In the same year that Lents competed in Miss World, she also competed on the Danish National Taekwondo team at the European Taekwondo Championships in Antalya, Turkey. 

After Lisa Lents became the Franchise of the pageant, Miss World Denmark pageant has become the biggest pageant in Denmark.

Winners
2021 - TBA
2020 - No Pageant due to COVID-19 pandemic
2019 - Natasja Kunde
2018 - Tara Jensen
2017 - Amanda Petri
2016 - Helena Heuser 
2015 - Jessica Josephina
2014 - Pernille Sørensen
2013 - Malene Riis Sørensen
2012 - Iris Thomsen (Top 30)
2011 - Maya Celeste Padillo Olesen
2010 - Natalya Averina
2009 - Nadia Ulbjerg Pedersen
2008 - Lisa Lents
2007 - Line Kruuse
2006 - Sandra Spohr
2005 - Trine Lundgaard Nielsen
2004 - Line Larsen

References

Beauty pageants in Denmark
2004 establishments in Denmark
Recurring events established in 2004
Awards established in 2004
Annual events in Denmark
Denmark
Danish awards